WWE Worlds Collide, or simply Worlds Collide, is a professional wrestling streaming television program. It was produced by WWE and featured interbrand competition between wrestlers from WWE's then-five brand divisions: Raw, SmackDown, NXT, NXT UK, and 205 Live. The program premiered on the WWE Network on April 14, 2019, and aired as a four-episode series, with the final episode airing on May 1, 2019. It was a follow-up to the 2019 Worlds Collide Tournament.

History
On January 26 and 27, 2019, during Royal Rumble Axxess, WWE filmed the Worlds Collide special. The special featured a tournament with wrestlers from WWE's NXT, NXT UK, and 205 Live brands.

On March 28, 2019, WWE announced that Worlds Collide would return during April's WrestleMania Axxess festival. In addition to the three brands previously featured at the Worlds Collide special, wrestlers from the Raw and SmackDown brands would also participate in the events. On April 9, WWE announced that these events would air as a four-episode streaming television series on the WWE Network  starting on April 14, under the title, WWE Worlds Collide. The series was taped on April 6–7 at Pier 12 in Brooklyn, New York and aired on April 14, 17, 24, and May 1.

Episodes

April 14, 2019

April 17, 2019

April 24, 2019

May 1, 2019

References

External links

2019 American television series debuts
WWE Network shows
WWE Raw
WWE SmackDown
WWE 205 Live
WWE NXT
NXT UK
TV series